Odontotermes preliminaris, is a species of termite of the genus Odontotermes. It is native to India and Sri Lanka..

References

External links

Termites
Insects described in 1911
Endemic fauna of India